Ustia may refer to:

Geography
 Ustia, Dubăsari, a commune in Dubăsari district, Moldova
 Ustia, Glodeni, a commune in Glodeni district, Moldova
 Ustia, Ukraine, a village in Ternopil Oblast
 Ustia, a river in Ukraine, a tributary of the Horyn
 Ostiano, spelled Üstià in Brescian, a commune in Cremona, Italy

Other uses
 Ustia (therapsid), an extinct genus of biarmosuchian therapsids
 US Travel Insurance Association (UStiA)

See also
 Ustya (disambiguation)